Huish Champflower is a village and civil parish in Somerset, England, three miles north-west of Wiveliscombe and ten miles north of Wellington. It has a population of 301 (Census 2011).

History
The name comes from the hiwisc, the Saxon for homestead, and it was recorded in the Domesday book as Hiwis, with the suffix marking its ownership by the family of Thomas de Champflower, who was Lord of the Manor by 1166.

Just outside the village, on the road to the Brendon Hills and Clatworthy Reservoir, is Huish Champflower round barrow.

The parish of Huish Champflower was part of the Williton and Freemanners Hundred.

A house called Washbottle, which stands on the River Tone as it flows through the village, represents the watermill which ground the corn for the village from 1086 until World War I.

Governance
The parish council has responsibility for local issues, including setting an annual precept (local rate) to cover the council’s operating costs and producing annual accounts for public scrutiny. The parish council evaluates local planning applications and works with the local police, district council officers, and neighbourhood watch groups on matters of crime, security, and traffic. The parish council's role also includes initiating projects for the maintenance and repair of parish facilities, as well as consulting with the district council on the maintenance, repair, and improvement of highways, drainage, footpaths, public transport, and street cleaning. Conservation matters (including trees and listed buildings) and environmental issues are also the responsibility of the council.

The village falls within the non-metropolitan district of Somerset West and Taunton, which was established on 1 April 2019. It was previously in the district of West Somerset, which was formed on 1 April 1974 under the Local Government Act 1972, and part of Dulverton Rural District before that. The district council is responsible for local planning and building control, local roads, council housing, environmental health, markets and fairs, refuse collection and recycling, cemeteries and crematoria, leisure services, parks, and tourism.

Somerset County Council is responsible for running the largest and most expensive local services such as education, social services, libraries, main roads, public transport, policing and  fire services, trading standards, waste disposal and strategic planning.

It is also part of the Bridgwater and West Somerset county constituency represented in the House of Commons of the Parliament of the United Kingdom. It elects one Member of Parliament (MP) by the first past the post system of election.

Church
St Peter's Church dates from the 15th century, with the north aisle being built in 1534. The tower arch dates from 1703, and the building was restored in 1875–80 when the chancel arch was rebuilt. It includes a tower with five bells, one of which was made in 1790 by Thomas Bilbie of the Bilbie family in Cullompton. It has been designated by English Heritage as a Grade I listed building. The church includes stained glass claimed to be from the remains of a Jesse window from Barlynch Priory near Dulverton, and a 15th-century lectern.

References

External links

Villages in West Somerset
Civil parishes in Somerset